The Stade Père Jégo is a multi-purpose stadium in Casablanca, Morocco. It is used mostly for football matches and is the home ground of Racing Casablanca. The stadium was named after Moroccan footballer and manager Père Jégo.

The stadium currently holds 5,000 spectators.

References

External links
Stade Père Jego

Football venues in Morocco
Sports venues in Casablanca